Vehicle registration plates of Sri Lanka (known in Sri Lanka as "number plates") started soon after introduction of motorcars in 1903. Initially the numbers started with Q, and the oldest existing plate is "Q 53" of a 1903 Wolsley. Later the island was divided into sections from "A " to "Z"  (Ex A 123 ), then after World War II it changed to the two Roman letter plates combining pairs of letters in the word CEYLON . These series were CL XXXX , EY XXXX, EL XXXx . Afterwards in 1956 a new system with the Sinhala script letter Sri (ශ්‍රී) in the middle was introduced, this started from Reg no "1 Sri 1".

The current version started in 2000. It was developed by the German Utsch AG using a variation of the FE-Schrift. As of 2013 a new system was introduced using 3 Latin letters and four digits, starting from “AAA 0001”. 

The international vehicle registration code for Sri Lanka is SL.

References

Sri Lanka
Road transport in Sri Lanka
JJJJ